Sean Garballey (born February 22, 1985) is the current Massachusetts State Representative for the 23rd Middlesex District representing Arlington and West Medford.  He was elected in a special election on 4 March 2008,  after the incumbent, J. James Marzilli, Jr. won a 2007 special election for a seat in the Massachusetts Senate.

Early life and career
Garballey, born in Arlington, Massachusetts attended Arlington Public Schools.  He earned a B.A. in Political Science from UMass Lowell in 2007.  At the time of his election he was enrolled in a dual Political Science and Public Administration masters program at Suffolk University, but did not complete the degree.

Elections

While completing college, he was elected to the Arlington School Committee in 2005 serving until 2008.

In the 5 February 2008 special Democratic primary election for the 23rd Middlesex District seat, Garballey faced off against fellow school committee member Jeff Thielman and first time candidate Andrew O'Brien. Garballey received 47% of the vote, with Thielman taking 43% and O'Brien taking 10%. Garballey went on to face Republican John Worden, former Arlington town moderator, and Independent Robert Valeri, a local businessman.  Garballey won the 4 March 2008 special election with 67% of the vote.  Worden received 29%, and Valeri received 4%. Garballey was elected at age 23.

In 2008 and 2010 Garballey ran unopposed in both the primary and general elections.

In 2012, Garballey was re-elected. He defeated Republican Joseph Monju in the general election.

Issues
In the 2013-2014 legislative session of the Massachusetts General Court, Garballey serves on the Joint Committee on Ways and Means, the Joint Committee on Health Care Financing, and the Joint Committee on Municipalities and Regional Government.

In the 2011-2012 session of the Massachusetts General Court, Garballey served as the vice-chairman to the Joint Committee on Election Laws.  He was also appointed to the Joint Committee on Municipalities and Regional Government, the Joint Committee on Tourism, Arts, and Cultural Development, as well as the Special Joint Committee on Redistricting.

On Education, Garballey, as a member of the Foster Care Coalition, joined Governor Deval Patrick for the signing of An Act Protecting Children in the Care of the Commonwealth.

On the Environment, Garballey supported the Oil-Spill Prevention legislation as well as the Creation of the Food Policy Council.

Public office
 Arlington Town Meeting member (2003–2008)
 Arlington School Committee (2005–2008)
 Massachusetts House of Representatives (2008–present)

See also
 2019–2020 Massachusetts legislature
 2021–2022 Massachusetts legislature

References

External links
Official House Website
Rep. Garballey's Blog

1985 births
Living people
Democratic Party members of the Massachusetts House of Representatives
University of Massachusetts Lowell alumni
People from Arlington, Massachusetts
21st-century American politicians
Arlington High School (Massachusetts) alumni